The Johnston Heights are snow-covered heights,  high, forming the southeastern corner of Otway Massif in the Grosvenor Mountains of Antarctica. They were mapped by the United States Geological Survey from surveys and U.S. Navy aerial photographs, 1959–63, and were named by the Advisory Committee on Antarctic Names for David P. Johnston, a member of a United States Antarctic Research Program geological party to the area in the 1967–68 season.

References

Mountains of the Ross Dependency
Dufek Coast